The Adventures of Chuck and Friends (also known as The Adventures of Chuck & Friends, Chuck and Friends, or simply Chuck & Friends) is a computer-animated television series that aired in the U.S. on The Hub's defunct HubBub block, with repeats which aired Saturday mornings on The CW as part of the Vortexx block.

The show was produced in collaboration by Toronto based studio Nelvana and Hasbro Studios. The Adventures of Chuck and Friends formerly aired on Tiny Pop and Cartoonito in the United Kingdom and on Treehouse TV in Canada.

In 2012, it was announced that Shout! Factory would release episodes of the show on DVD, starting February 14 with "Friends to the Finish".

Episodes

Characters
 Chuck is the main character of the series. He is a male red dump truck with a manual transmission. Chuck aspires to be a race truck. His parents are Haulie and Porter, and he has an older brother named Rally. He has various friends, and tries to be the best friend he can be, though he can sometimes be selfish and a bit angry. For example, in "Lights, Camera, Trucks", he repeatedly stops a film production in order to get it perfect. Also, in "Fender Bender", when he accidentally gets injured by Boomer by playing tag, he takes advantage of Boomer in order to get out of cleaning his room. It is revealed in "The Best" that he is great at racing on paved roads. He often uses the phrases "Red-hot turbo chargers!" and "Powering pickups!" He, along with his friends, chant the phrase, "Friends for the long haul!" Chuck’s model is a Fusion Greenman. 
 Rowdy is a male green garbage truck. He is one of Chuck's friends. Like his type of truck indicates, he enjoys getting filthy, usually to the chagrin of his friends. In one episode, it is revealed that he is great at finding things, although he loses the horn his grandfather gave him in the episode "Mystery, He Rode". He likes sleeping sometimes. Rowdy’s model is a Wizota D3-7. 
 Handy is a male blue tow truck. He is one of Chuck's friends. As his name indicates, he has various objects, usually tools, in the bed of his truck. He also has a hook. He is often seen with Soku. In the episode, "Charlie the Screwdriver", it is revealed he has a younger brother named Clutch who is also a tow truck and is missing a front tooth to indicate his young age. Handy is a Wizota Forest.
 Digger is a male yellow backhoe loader. He is one of Chuck's friends. As his name indicates, he enjoys digging. He has a Spanish accent. He refers to his friends as "amigos". In the episode "The Best", it is revealed that he can race best on a track with obstacles. He's very good at keeping an eye on vehicles in danger (hinted in the episode "Sleepdriving Chuck" where he has to keep an eye-out for Chuck after Chuck gets into an accident while playing a game). Digger's model is a Wizota Toughlander. 
 Spill is a female gray and dark orange cement mixer.
 Tiera is a male orange wheel loader.
 Blister is a male orange mobile crane.
 Tween is a female yellow steamroller.
 Biggs is a male orange monster truck. He is one of Chuck's friends. As his name indicates, he is a big truck (though he seems to be shorter than Digger). He has a Texas accent which is evidenced by the horns on his and his Father's cab roofs. He refers to his friends as his "buddies". In "The Best", it is revealed that he can race best on a dirt track. His catchphrase is "Wa-hoo!". Biggs is a Wizota Albatross.
 Boomer is a male red fire engine. He is one of Chuck's friends. Boomer seems to have a gut feeling that a plan might not work. This is seen whenever he voices his opinion that he is not sure about something. He also seems to be the most loyal to Chuck. This is seen in "Fender Bender", when, although Chuck had a minor injury on his side, he tended to Chuck. Boomer is a Wizota Douglas.
 Flip is a new friend of Chuck's. As his name indicates, he is a male stunt truck/bounce-back racer that flips. He has two sides: one that allows him to speed (green), and one that allows him to maneuver around obstacles (blue). He was introduced in the movie, The Big Air Dare. Although he is competitive with Chuck, he turns out to be a caring friend who hates to see Chuck endangered. He is probably part of the regular cast of characters since he also appears in a second season episode. While he still retains his competitive attitude, he was one of the three main characters that lost his first voice actor. Flip is a Wizota RX-7.
 Haulie is Chuck's mom. As her name indicates, she is a female yellow forklift. She runs a repair center. In the episode, "Sleepdriving Chuck", it reveals she makes a  promise to Digger to keep an eye-out for her son when he goes "sleep-driving". Haulie’s model is a Fusion Pine.
 Porter is Chuck's dad. As his name indicates, he is a male blue big rig. He runs the diner. He is one of the three characters that lost his first voice actor. Porter is a Fusion Skyline. 
 Soku is a male blue souped-up cruiser car. He is one of Chuck's friends. As his name indicates, he is of Japanese origin. This is shown in "Soku-Kun", when Kazuo, his cousin from Japan visits. He is often seen with Handy. He is one of the three characters that lost his first voice actor. Although he and Biggs got bored of making the film perfect, that was revealed in "Lights, Camera, Trucks!". Soku is a Wizota AMC-12. 
 Rally is Chuck's older brother. As his name indicates, he is a male blue racing truck. He seems to be quite successful. Unlike most sibling pairs, Chuck enjoys his brother, even though he is famous. Chuck seems to look up to his older brother and, instead of getting jealous, he aspires to be a racing truck like him. Rally's motto is "Over, around, and through, trucks go and see and do!" This is sometimes repeated by Chuck to his friends, like in episodes such as "The Pothole" as well as in the main title theme song. He has a racing truck friend named "Flash" who mumbles and only Rally can understand him, saying in the episode "Race to the Race" where Flash was also introduced. He is mentioned again in the episode "Charlie the Screwdriver". Rally is a Fusion Cobra.
 Chassie is a female lilac truck who first appeared in the second season. She enjoys nothing more than to dance away with her friends.
 Chomper is a mergin pile driver with a scrap claw.
 Buzzsaw ia a maroon logging big rig with a trencher.
 Philip the Loader is a blue skid-steer telehandler.
 Elmer is a school bus who has failing parts and cannot run properly. Elmer is a 1977 Fusion Osprey.

Cast
 Stacey DePass - Boomer
 Fabrizio Fillipo - Digger
 Darren Frost - Rowdy
 Gabriel Giammaria - Chuck
 Gabriel Giuliani - Handy
 Lauren Holly - Haulie
 Lyon Smith - Rally
 Joanne Vannicola - Biggs
 Dale Yim - Soku (season 1)
 Blair Williams - Porter (season 1)
 Sam Barringer - Flip (season 2)
 Jeremy Harris - Porter (season 2)
 Jake Sim - Clutch (season 2)
 Laurie Elliot - Soku (season 2)

Reception
Watchdog group Common Sense Media says that The Adventures of Chuck and Friends is "an entertaining series" and "filled with positive messages."

References

External links
  at Hasbro Studios
 

2010s toys
2010s preschool education television series
2010s American animated television series
2010s American children's television series
2010 American television series debuts
2012 American television series endings
2010s Canadian animated television series
2010s Canadian children's television series
2010 Canadian television series debuts
2012 Canadian television series endings
American children's animated adventure television series
American children's animated fantasy television series
American children's animated sports television series
American computer-animated television series
American preschool education television series
Animated preschool education television series
Animated television series about auto racing
Canadian children's animated adventure television series
Canadian children's animated fantasy television series
Canadian children's animated sports television series
Canadian computer-animated television series
Canadian preschool education television series
Cartoonito original programming
Discovery Family original programming
Treehouse TV original programming
English-language television shows
Television shows based on Hasbro toys
Television series by Hasbro Studios
Television series by Nelvana